Sílvia Soler Espinosa (born 19 November 1987) is a retired Spanish tennis player.

In her career, she won one doubles title on the WTA Tour, as well as five singles and three doubles titles on the ITF Women's Circuit. On 21 May 2012, she reached her best singles ranking of world No. 54. On 28 April 2014, she peaked at No. 39 in the doubles rankings.

Playing for Spain Fed Cup team, Soler Espinosa has a win–loss record of 4–11.

Personal life and background
Soler Espinosa is coached by Jerome Adamec. Her father works in a factory, while her mother is a housewife. She stated that her favourite court is clay. Silvia cited Steffi Graf as one of her biggest tennis idols.

Junior career
In 2002, Soler Espinosa made her debut on the ITF Junior Circuit at the age of 14. That year, she won her first ITF junior title in doubles, at the International Madrid, together with Astrid Waernes-Garcia. In September 2003, she won her first single title at Torneo ITF Junior "Ciudad de Castro Urdiales". Later that year, in singles, she made her junior highest-ranking at No. 158. On junior tour, she won three titles in singles, and two titles in doubles.

ITF Women's Circuit
Soler Espinosa debuted on ITF Circuit in May 2003 at Almeria, Spain, where she was defeated Lauren Cheung in the first round. In 2007, she won her first ITF single title, at a $25k event in Sintra, Portugal. There, she defeated Dutch player Romana Janshen in two tiebreakers. In 2011, she played and won her first major ITF final, at the 2011 Allianz Cup in Sofia, Bulgaria. On the ITF Circuit, she won five singles and two doubles titles.

WTA Tour

2009-10: WTA Tour debut 
In April 2009, Silver Espinosa made her first main-draw appearance at Andalucia Tennis Experience, Marbella, Spain. She lost in first round from Kaia Kanepi. Silvia failed to qualify at all four grand slams.

2011: First Grand Slam main draw; entering top 100
Soler Espinosa made her first grand slam main-draw appearance at 2011 French Open. There she also made her first grand slam won. Later, in second round, she was stopped from chinese player Li Na. At Wimbledon, she failed to qualify in third round of qualification. At US Open, she won two matches in main-draw, before she was stopped in third round against Carla Suárez Navarro, in straight-sets. On September 19, 2011 she entered top 100, reaching place of 90.

2012: First Premier Mandatory and Premier 5 main draws; Olympic Games debut
Silvia started season at the Sydney International, where she failed in qualifying. After that, she lost in the first round of the Australian Open. In February, she recorded two losses against Russian Fed Cup team, losing to Maria Sharapova and Svetlana Kuznetsova, respectively.

In March 2012, she made her first Premier Mandatory appearance, at the Indian Wells Open. She lost in the second round against Roberta Vinci. In Miami, she went one step further, and came to third round, where she was stopped from Agnieszka Radwańska.

In April 2012, she again played with Fed Cup team and scored of 1–1 against Slovakia.

In May, Soler Espinosa made her first match win at the Madrid Open. She was stopped by Li Na in the second round. She also made second round at the Italian Open.

At Wimbledon, she reached the second round, but then was stopped by Vera Zvonareva, in three sets. After that, Soler Espinosa reached the second round of the Swedish Open in Båstad, losing to Anastasia Pavlyuchenkova in straight sets.

In August 2012, Silvia made her first appearance at the Olympic Games, playing for Spain, but she was defeated in the first round by Heather Watson.

Second year in row, she made third round at the US Open.

2013: First Grand Slam quarterfinal and Premier Mandatory semifinal in doubles
In doubles, she reached quarterfinals at the Australian Open, together with Carla Suarez Navarro. They were stopped by Russian pair of Ekaterina Makarova and Elena Vesnina. Together with Suárez Navarro, Silvia made another great result, reaching semifinals at the Madrid Open.

In doubles, she entered top 50, reaching No. 59, on July 8, 2013.

Performance timelines

Singles

Doubles

WTA career finals

Singles: 2 (2 runner–ups)

Doubles: 2 (1 title, 1 runner–up)

WTA 125 finals

Doubles: 1 (runner-up)

ITF finals

Singles: 10 (5 titles, 5 runner–ups)

Doubles: 8 (2 titles, 6 runner–ups)

Notes

References

External links

 
 
 

1987 births
Living people
Sportspeople from Elche
Spanish female tennis players
Tennis players from the Valencian Community
Olympic tennis players of Spain
Tennis players at the 2012 Summer Olympics